The 2012 Sunshine Tour is the 13th season of professional golf tournaments since the southern Africa based Sunshine Tour was relaunched in 2000, and the 6th since the tour switched a calendar based season in 2007. The Sunshine Tour represents the highest level of competition for male professional golfers in the region.

The tour is based predominantly in South Africa with other events being held in neighbouring countries, including Zimbabwe, Swaziland, Zambia and Namibia.

As usual, the tour consists of two distinct parts, commonly referred to as the "Summer Swing" and the "Winter Swing". Tournaments held during the Summer Swing generally have much higher prize funds, attract stronger fields, and until 2012 were the only tournaments on the tour to carry world ranking points, with some events being co-sanctioned with the European Tour. Since the tour switched to a calendar based season, this part of the tour has been split in two, with some events being held at the start of the year, and the remainder in November and December. Beginning in 2012, all events will carry world ranking points, with the "Winter Swing" 72-hole events having a minimum of 6 points and the 54-hole events having a minimum of 4 points, compared with the 14 point minimum for the "Summer Swing" events.

Schedule
The following table lists official events during the 2012 season.

Order of Merit
The Order of Merit was based on prize money won during the season, calculated in South African rand.

Charl Schwartzel (3.2 million) and Louis Oosthuizen (1.7 million) did not play the minimum number of tournaments required to be ranked.

Notes

References

External links

Sunshine Tour
Sunshine Tour